Camp Logan, Illinois was an Illinois National Guard base and rifle range from 1892 to the early 1970s. Several buildings survive today as they are listed on the National Register of Historic Places.

Camp Logan was named after General John Alexander Logan.

The Camp Logan site is now part of the Adeline Jay Geo-Karis Illinois Beach State Park.

References

External links
History of Camp Logan https://web.archive.org/web/20080429054110/http://dnr.state.il.us/OREP/nrrc/cultural/cmpLogan/camplogan.htm

Buildings and structures in Lake County, Illinois
Closed installations of the United States Army
Training installations of the United States Army
National Register of Historic Places in Lake County, Illinois
Military facilities on the National Register of Historic Places in Illinois
Historic districts on the National Register of Historic Places in Illinois